China Huaneng Group Co., Ltd., abbreviated as  CHNG  or Huaneng Group, is one of the five largest state-owned electricity generation enterprises in China, administrated by the State-owned Assets Supervision and Administration Commission of the State Council. It engages in the investment, construction, operation and management of power generation assets and the production and sale of electricity. In 2012, the company was ranked 246th on the Fortune 500 list.

History
The group was part of a project that replacing oil fired power plant to coal power plant. In 1995, Huaneng Coal Corporation became a separate state-owned enterprise group that under the provisional supervision of the State Planning Committee, as Shenhua Group. China Huaneng Group was then became the subsidiary of the State Power Corporation of China, a mega-conglomerate that replacing the commercial function of the Ministry of Power Industry. In 2002, the State Power Corporation of China was dismantled as groups of companies of power grid (such as State Grid Corporation of China and China Southern Power Grid) and power plants (such as the big five power groups, Huaneng, China Huadian, China Datang Corporation, China Guodian Corporation and China Power Investment Corporation) In the same year the leader of the mega-conglomerate, Gao Yan had fled China after being investigated for corruption.

In 1994, it also saw the formation of two listed subsidiaries, Huaneng Power International (HPI) and Shandong Huaneng Power Development. Their American depositary shares were listed on the New York Stock Exchange. HPI later also started initial public offerings on the Stock Exchange of Hong Kong as well as the Shanghai Stock Exchange. The shares of Huaneng Power International was owned by aforementioned Huaneng International Power Development Corporation, but in recent years China Huaneng Group also owned some shares directly. HPI also merged with Shandong Huaneng Power Development in 2000.

In 2011 China Huaneng Group floated its wind power subsidiary Huaneng Renewables on the Stock Exchange of Hong Kong.

Operations
The company oversees the national government's interests in 10 subsidiaries, including a 51% stake in Huaneng Power International. Through subsidiaries it develops and operates more than 130 thermal, wind power and hydropower plants. In addition to its power-generation business, the company enters other sectors, including energy-related mining, financing, transportation, information technology, and renewable energy researches. The company's investment division ranks the 15th in China by revenue and the 21st by asset size. The company owns the Changjiang Nuclear Power Plant in partnership with China National Nuclear Corporation, as well as the Beijing Huaneng Thermal Power Station. The latter, however, is to be closed by 2016 as part of Beijing's plan to eradicate pollution.

Environmental projects
A sophisticated and expensive technology is to convert coal to gas and strip out the carbon dioxide before the gas is used to generate power.   It has a billion dollar project underway called the GreenGen project led by China Huaneng Group, that is scheduled to go online by 2011 at the latest.

Acquisitions
In March 2008 CHNG acquired Singapore-based Tuas Power from Temasek Holdings for US$3.04 billion. It was resold to China Huaneng Group's listed subsidiary Huaneng Power International in the same year. In November 2008 CHNG bought 50 per cent stake in InterGen from India's GMR Group for $1.2 billion.

Structure

Beijing Headquarter 
The headquarter of Huaneng Group is located on the Chang'an Street of Beijing, only about 3 kilometers from Tian'anmen. In the headquarter, there are several subsidiaries and departments to take charge of different types of business. Major departments in the Beijing headquarter include:
 Department of General Administration 
 Department of Capital Operations and Equity Management
 Department of Supervision
 Department of Development
 Department of Safe Production
 Department of Auditing
 Department of Budget and Planning
 Department of Environmental Protection, Sciences and Technology
 Department of Political Affairs
 Department of Legal Affairs
 Department of Engineering
 Department of Operations
 Department of Finance
 Department of Human Resource
 Department of International Cooperations
 Labor Union

Subsidiaries 
The Huaneng Group runs several subsidiaries corresponding to various types of energy industries.  Most of those subsidiaries are based in the Beijing headquarter.
 Huaneng International Power Development Corporation
 Huaneng Properties
 GreenGen
 Huaneng Power International (It is listed on the Hong Kong Stock Exchange, Shanghai Stock Exchange and New York Stock Exchange. It is the Group's main thermal power subsidiary, holding about one third of the Group's installed thermal capacity.)
 Huaneng Energy and Transportation
 China Huaneng Group Clean Energy Research Institute
 Huaneng Renewables (having a capacity of over 10 GW wind power and 800 MW solar power as of 2017)
 Huaneng Capital Service
 Huaneng Guicheng Trust
 China Huaneng Group Fuel
 Huaneng Nuclear Power Development Company
 Huaneng Technology Innovation Center
 Huaneng Coal Industry Company

Regional Branches 
In addition to Beijing headquarter, Huaneng Group also have branches and companies in at least 29 different provinces or autonomous regions of China. Those regional branches and companies are in real charge of local power plants and electricity generation in each province or region, as well as some other related business. Currently, Huaneng's regional companies and branches include:

Research 
China Huaneng Group also takes on science and technology researches in energy-related fields. The company's current research directions and interests include:
 Advanced high-efficiency thermal power generation technology
 Thermal power generation environmental technology
 Coal-based low-carbon conversion technology
 Wind power development
 Hydropower development
 LNG
 Renewable energy and new energy
 Shale Gas
 Coal mining technology
 Energy system
 Energy-related information technology

References

External links

 

 
Electric power companies of China
Government-owned companies of China
Companies based in Beijing
Chinese brands
Chinese companies established in 1989
Xicheng District
Energy companies established in 1989